DJ “Blinky” Bill Sellanga is a Kenyan musician/producer and DJ based in Nairobi. He is also a founder of the Kenyan art and music collective Just A Band. 

Sellanga chose his stage name "Blinky Bill" after seeing his name in a newspaper and thinking that it looked too boring. The name was inspired by the Australian cartoon of the same name, which was also his nickname in high school.

Music career 
When Sellanga studied at Kenyatta University, he met Daniel Muli and Jim Chuchu and formed the alternative art and music collective Just A Band. Their debut album, Scratch to Reveal, was released in 2008. In 2010, the music video for their hit single Ha-He became widely described as Kenya's first viral video.

In 2018, Sellanga released his first solo studio album, Everyone’s Just Winging It And Other Fly Tales. One of the album tracks, Feeling It, appeared on the original motion picture soundtrack of the 2018 film Rafiki. The album followed the EP We Cut Keys While You Wait from 2016.

Emirates partnered with Sellanga in 2019 to create a "pan-African anthem" celebrating the talent and achievements of young Africans. It was part of Emirates' "New Africa" campaign. The campaign described Sellanga as the "embodiment of a renaissance in African music".

Sellanga is a TED fellow and was named to the Yerba Buena Centre of the Arts’ 2018 YBCA 100 list of people shifting culture and creating change.

Discography

Studio albums

Solo 

 Everyone’s Just Winging It And Other Fly Tales (2018)

Just A Band 

 Scratch To Reveal (2008)
 82 (2009)
 Sorry for the Delay (2012)

EPs

Solo 

 We Cut Keys While You Wait (2016)

Just A Band 

 The Light Fantastic EP (2006)
 BLNRB (2010)

References 

 

Year of birth missing (living people)
Living people
Kenyan musicians